Minuscule 401 (in the Gregory-Aland numbering), ε 236 (in the Soden numbering), is a Greek minuscule manuscript of the New Testament, on parchment. Palaeographically it has been assigned to the 12th century. It has marginalia.

Description 

The codex contains a complete text of the four Gospels on 113 parchment leaves with some lacunae. The text is written in one column per page, in 23 lines per page.

 Contents 
John 1:1-12:1; Mark 6:1-16:20; Matthew, Luke.

There is also a division according to the smaller Ammonian Sections, but without references to the Eusebian Canons.

Text 

The Greek text of the codex is a representative of the Byzantine text-type. Hermann von Soden classified it to the textual family Kx. Aland placed it in Category V.

According to the Claremont Profile Method it has mixed text in Luke 1. In Luke 10 and Luke 20 it has a mixture of the Byzantine text-types and creates a pair with 1013 (in Luke 10 and Luke 20).

The text of the Pericope Adulterae (John 7:53-8:11) is omitted.

History 

It was dated to the 11th or 12th century. Currently it is dated by the INTF to the 12th century.

The manuscript was added to the list of New Testament manuscripts by Scholz (1794-1852).
Scholz described it in Biblisch-kritische Reise (p. 135). C. R. Gregory saw it in 1886.

The manuscript is currently housed at the Biblioteca Nazionale Vittorio Emanuele III (Ms. II. A. 3) in Naples.

See also 

 List of New Testament minuscules
 Biblical manuscript
 Textual criticism

References

Further reading 

 

Greek New Testament minuscules
12th-century biblical manuscripts